Acteocina bullata, common name the striate barrel bubble, is a species of small sea snail, a marine opisthobranch gastropod mollusk in the family Acteocinidae, the barrel bubble snails.

Description
The length of the shell varies between 5 mm and 10 mm.

The small shell is oblong and cylindrical. It is of a diaphanous white. It is very fine and shows very close transverse striae cover the whole of the shell. The  short, conical spire is composed of five whorls, the sutures of which are canaliculated. The oblong aperture is narrow in its two upper thirds, and dilated at its base. The thin outer lip is round, and notched at the upper part at its union with the inner lip. The columella shows one fold.

Distribution
This species occurs in the Caribbean Sea, the Gulf of Mexico and off Puerto Rico; also off East Brasil.

References

 Rosenberg, G.; Moretzsohn, F.; García, E. F. (2009). Gastropoda (Mollusca) of the Gulf of Mexico, Pp. 579–699 in: Felder, D.L. and D.K. Camp (eds.), Gulf of Mexico–Origins, Waters, and Biota. Texas A&M Press, College Station, Texas.

External links
 
 

Acteocinidae
Gastropods described in 1834